The 2012–13 Israeli Noar Premier League was the 19th season since its introduction in 1994 as the top-tier football in Israel for teenagers between the ages 18–20, and the second under the name Noar Premier League.

Maccabi Haifa won the title, whilst Hapoel Kfar Saba and Hapoel Jerusalem were relegated.

Final table

References

External links
 2012-2013 Noar Premier League IFA 
Noar Premier League 12-13 One.co.il 

Israeli Noar Premier League seasons
Noar Premier League